Arthur Grundmann (23 March 1920 – 16 August 1987) was a German politician of the Free Democratic Party (FDP) and former member of the German Bundestag.

Life 
In the election to the first Bundestag in 1949, he was elected to parliament via the North Rhine-Westphalia state list. Grundmann was a full member of the Committee for Petitions, for Labour and from October 1950 to October 1951 also of the Committee for Borderland Issues.

Literature

References

1920 births
1987 deaths
Members of the Bundestag for North Rhine-Westphalia
Members of the Bundestag 1949–1953
Members of the Bundestag for the Free Democratic Party (Germany)